The , abbreviated to Nitech (or in Japanese to 名工大, Meikōdai), is a public highest-level educational institution of science and technology located in Nagoya, Japan. 
Nitech was founded in 1905 as Nagoya Higher Technical School, then renamed Nagoya College of Technology in 1944, and then merged under the new educational system with the Aichi Prefectural College of Technology to be refounded as Nagoya Institute of Technology in 1949. In 2004 it was refounded as National University Corporation Nagoya Institute of Technology.

Schools, Departments and Laboratories

Faculty of Engineering
Life Science and Applied Chemistry
Physical Science and Engineering
Electrical and Mechanical Engineering
Computer Science
Architecture, Civil Engineering and Industrial Management Engineering
Creative Engineering Program

Graduate School of Engineering
Life Science and Applied Chemistry
Physical Science and Engineering
Electrical and Mechanical Engineering
Computer Science
Architecture, Civil Engineering and Industrial Management Engineering
Nanopharmaceutical Sciences
Nagoya Institute of Technology and University of Wollongong Joint Degree Doctoral Program in Informatics

Educational Research Centers
Center for Research on Assistive Technology for Building New Communities
OptoBioTechnology Research Center
Advanced Ceramics Research Center
Innovation Center for Multi-Business of Nitride Semiconductors
Research Center for Nano Devices and Advanced Materials
Advanced Manufacturing Research Center
Center of Biomedical Physics and Information Technology
NITech Artificial Intelligence Research Center
Advanced Disaster Prevention Engineering Center

Notable alumni
 
 
Takayuki Ito
Ken
Taiichi Ohno

Academic rankings

External links
Nagoya Institute of Technology

Notes

Universities and colleges in Nagoya
Japanese national universities
Engineering universities and colleges in Japan
Technical universities and colleges in Japan
Educational institutions established in 1905
1905 establishments in Japan